Peninsula was a summer music festival taking place annually in Transylvania, Romania. It was one of Romania's largest music festivals.

Festival
Peninsula was an eclectic festival, with stages for different musical styles: rock, metal, pop, electro, world music, folk, hip-hop, blues and jazz. The festival gathered yearly up to 10–15 major bands, and up to 40–70 Central and Eastern European bands which are more or less known outside their countries' borders.

Besides, the festival featured a number of other activities: about 30 sports (football, table tennis, badminton, beach volleyball, chess, sumo, paintball, karting, archery, zip-line, kayaking, swimming etc.) including some extreme sport facilities (bungee jumping, climbing, paragliding etc.), movie projections in partnership with the Transilvania International Film Festival, theatre shows and workshops, stand-up comedy shows, graffiti contests and other creative activities, ecological workshops, volunteering workshops and training etc.

Volunteering was another important aspect of this festival. Annually, hundreds of youngsters from all over Romania gathered at this event and enhanced their experience by volunteering activities within the festival.

History 
The first edition of the festival goes back to 2003. Organised by some members of the team of Sziget Festival, Peninsula (in Romanian) has grown steadily in terms of audience (from 20,000 in 2003 to 60,000 in 2009) as in the number, the variety and the quality of the bands: at the first edition there were Romanian bands, but in later editions bands from all over the world were invited.

In 2013, the organisers have decided to move the festival to a different city, namely Cluj-Napoca. As the city was chosen as the 2015 European Youth Capital, it only seemed as a strategical move. However, participants experienced a number of loopholes, from smaller location to a smaller number of bands. Initially, the line-up featured well-known bands such as Kaiser Chiefs, who eventually had to cancel.

After 2013, the festival was cancelled. Since 2017, VIBE festival is held in the location of the old Peninsula / Félsziget.

Line-ups

See also
Gărâna Jazz Festival - Gărâna, Caraş-Severin

References

External links
 Félsziget Official homepage (English)

Music festivals in Romania
Electronic music festivals in Romania